Philippa Jane Boyens  (born 1962) is a New Zealand screenwriter and film producer who co-wrote the screenplay for Peter Jackson's films The Lord of the Rings series, King Kong, The Lovely Bones, and the three-part film The Hobbit, all with Jackson and Fran Walsh.

She, Jackson, and Walsh won the Academy Award for Best Adapted Screenplay for The Lord of the Rings: The Return of the King at the 76th Academy Awards in 2004. She was also co-producer on every one of Jackson's films since King Kong, and on District 9. Prior to screen-writing, Boyens worked in theater as a playwright, teacher, producer, and editor. She also spent time as director of the New Zealand Writers Guild.

Personal life
Born in 1962, Boyens is the daughter of John Fraser Boyens and Jane Moana Menhennet. She was educated at Massey High School, and was later a part-time student at the University of Auckland, graduating with a BA in English and history in 1994. She received a Distinguished Alumni Award from the university in 2006.

She has three children: daughter Phoebe Gittins and son Calum Gittins (both with actor Paul Gittins); and a second son, Isaac Miller. Phoebe appeared as a Hobbit in The Lord of the Rings: The Fellowship of the Ring, as one of George Harvey's victims in The Lovely Bones, and as a wench in the Prancing Pony in The Hobbit: The Desolation of Smaug; Calum appeared as Haleth in The Lord of the Rings: The Two Towers; and Isaac appeared as a young Hobbit in a flashback of the Old Took's party in the extended edition of The Hobbit: An Unexpected Journey.

In the 2004 Queen's Birthday Honours, Boyens was appointed a Member of the New Zealand Order of Merit, for services to film.

Work on Lord of the Rings
Boyens first became a Tolkien fan as a child. When she came on board to help the writing team on The Lord of the Rings, she had already read the book seven times.

Filmography

Writer

Producer

Soundtrack

References

1962 births
21st-century New Zealand women writers
21st-century New Zealand writers
21st-century screenwriters
Best Adapted Screenplay Academy Award winners
Best Adapted Screenplay BAFTA Award winners
Hugo Award-winning writers
Living people
Members of the New Zealand Order of Merit
Nebula Award winners
New Zealand screenwriters
New Zealand women screenwriters
People educated at Massey High School
University of Auckland alumni